The men's high jump event at the 1992 World Junior Championships in Athletics was held in Seoul, Korea, at Olympic Stadium on 18 and 20 September.

Medalists

Results

Final
20 September

Qualifications
18 Sep

Group A

Group B

Participation
According to an unofficial count, 32 athletes from 23 countries participated in the event.

References

High jump
High jump at the World Athletics U20 Championships